Gorka Márquez (born 4 September 1990) is a Spanish professional dancer, best known for appearing on the British dance show Strictly Come Dancing.

Early life
Márquez began dancing at the age of 12, and in 2010 he represented Spain at the World Latin Championships, before reaching the semi-finals of the 2012 World DanceSport Federation World Cup. In 2014, Márquez joined the touring live dance show Burn the Floor as one of their leads, performing with the dance company all over the world.

Strictly Come Dancing
In 2016 Márquez became a professional dancer on the BBC ballroom dancing show Strictly Come Dancing for its fourteenth series. He was partnered with EastEnders actress Tameka Empson, and they were eliminated in week three of the competition.

In 2017, he returned in the show's fifteenth series. He was partnered with singer and former The X Factor winner, Alexandra Burke. They reached the final, finishing as joint runners-up. With Burke, Márquez holds the record for achieving the most tens in a single series with 32, surpassing Danny Mac and Oti Mabuse’s previous record of 26 tens.

In 2018 he participated in the show's sixteenth series, where he was partnered with television presenter and campaigner Katie Piper. The couple were eliminated in week four of the competition, finishing in 13th place. 

The following year, Márquez announced that he had been demoted from the main professional line-up, but explained that he would still participate in the weekly group dances.

In 2020 Márquez returned as a professional for the show's eighteenth series, reaching the final  with EastEnders actress Maisie Smith.

In 2021 he returned in the show's nineteenth series, reaching week three with Coronation Street actress Katie McGlynn.

In 2022, he returned in the show's twentieth series. reaching the final with television presenter Helen Skelton.

Highest and lowest scores

Highest and Lowest Scores Per Dance

Series 14: with Tameka Empson

Series 15: with Alexandra Burke

Series 16: with Katie Piper

Series 18: with Maisie Smith

Series 19: with Katie McGlynn

Series 20: with Helen Skelton

Dance tours and other professional engagements 
In September 2022 Márquez announced he would be appearing at Donahey's 2023 Dancing with The Stars Weekends.

Personal life
As of 2023, Márquez is engaged to British actress Gemma Atkinson. Atkinson gave birth to a baby girl, Mia, on 4 July 2019. She and Márquez announced their engagement on 14 February 2021.

References

1990 births
Spanish expatriates in England
Living people
Spanish male dancers
Spanish choreographers
People from Bilbao
Participants in British reality television series